East Litchfield is an unincorporated village in the town of Litchfield, Litchfield County, Connecticut.

The village of East Litchfield sits at the crossroads of the highways that connect Waterbury and Torrington; Hartford and Litchfield and the Naugatuck River that connects communities from Bridgeport to Winsted.  East Litchfield, like Bantam, Milton and Northfield are parts of the town of Litchfield and have been since the town was settled in 1721.

Over 3,000 years ago Native Americans found East Litchfield to be a hunting ground rich with wild game. They used the outcroppings of soapstone to make various vessels for food and drink.  The area was also rich with quartz that was used for arrowheads and centuries later sent to Massachusetts for sandpaper production.

When Europeans settled in the area it became a community of farmers and mill workers. Naugatuck Valley Railroad built a depot in 1849 and extended the train to Winsted. The mills along the Naugatuck River were able to load their freight and passengers could disembark at East Litchfield and get a stage coach to Litchfield center where they could take their summer retreats.  Harwinton Fair attendees would take the train to and from East Litchfield where they would catch the shuttle to the Fair Grounds.

Along the sides the Naugatuck River in East Litchfield were many mills; the Paige and Dains Paper Mill and Baldwin's Saw Mill were two. Ice was harvested from the Naugatuck River and stored in an icehouse built by the railroad company.

After the establishment of the depot East Litchfield had a hotel and restaurant (Scovill House), a post office, blacksmith shop, harness shop, livery service to Litchfield center, Ferncliff Farm with a store and cheese factory, Mrs. Mark's variety store across from the depot, a chapel, one-room schoolhouse, icehouses, a baseball field, lumber mill, grist mill, cider mill and a paper factory.

All of the above-mentioned business establishments disappeared after the depot closed; the chapel is still there and just a few of the original village homes.

Notable residents
Town of Litchfield artist Austin Purves was a long time resident of East Litchfield.

Transportation
The Naugatuck Railroad ran from Bridgeport to Winsted and in 1849 established a depot in East Litchfield .

Litchfield, Connecticut
Villages in Connecticut
Villages in Litchfield County, Connecticut